Vân Đồn is a rural district of Quảng Ninh province in the Northeast region of Vietnam. As of 2003 the district had a population of 39,157. The district covers an area of 551 km². The district capital lies at Cái Rồng. The district is selected as a Special Economic Zone, and is rapidly being developed. It is connected by motorway to Hai Phong and Ha Long, and served by Van Don International Airport.

History
The name Vân Đồn stems from the Vân Mountain on Quan Lạn Island, Quang Ninh province, Vietnam. In AD 980, the early Lê Dynasty of Vietnam (980-1009) set up an army outpost there. In 1149 under the reign of Lý Anh Tông (1138-1175), the Vân Đồn island authority was officially formed as a strategic location, at the same time as a busy trading port of Đại Việt. The port was bustling under the dynasties of Lý (1009-1225), Trần (1225-1400), and later Lê (1442-1789) hosting trading ships from other countries.

Vân Đồn is also home to various historical sites representing important events in the Vietnamese national fight against foreign invaders. In 1288, on the Mang River on Quan Lạn Island, under the command of General Trần Khánh Dư, the Vietnamese troops defeated Yuan-Mongol invaders in the historic Bạch Đằng victory.

Fujian was the origin of the ethnic Chinese Trần dynasty royal family who migrated to Vietnam along with a large amount of other Chinese during the Lý dynasty where they served as officials. Distinctly Chinese last names are found in the Trần and Lý dynasty Imperial exam records. Ethnic Chinese are recorded in Trần and Lý dynasty records of officials. Clothing, food, and language were all Chinese dominated in Vân Đồn where the Trần had moved to after leaving their home province of Fujian. The Chinese language could still be spoken by the Trần in Vietnam. The ocean side area of Vietnam was colonized by Chinese migrants from Fujian which included the Trần among them located to the capital's southeastern area. The Red River Delta was subjected to migration from Fujian including the Trần and Vân Đồn port arose as a result of this interaction. Guangdong and Fujian Chinese moved to the Halong located Vân Đồn coastal port during Ly Anh Tong's rule in order to engage in commerce. The usurpation of the Lý occurred after they married with the fishing Fujianese Trần family.

Administrative divisions
Cái Rồng, Đông Xá, Hạ Long, Bình Dân, Đoàn Kết, Đài Xuyên, Vạn Yên,  Minh Châu, Quan Lạn, Ngọc Vừng, Bản Sen, Thắng Lợi.

References

Districts of Quảng Ninh province